Kevin Harding (born 19 March 1957) is an English retired footballer who played in the Football League for Brentford as a defender.

Playing career

Brentford 
Harding was one of the first players recruited when the Brentford youth team was relaunched in 1972. He captained the youth team during the 1972–73 season and made a London Challenge Cup appearance for the reserve team against Tottenham Hotspur while still aged 15. Harding made three league appearances during the Bees' 1974–75 Fourth Division campaign. Harding was released at the end of the season.

Hayes 
Harding joined Isthmian League First Division club Hayes during the 1975 off-season and made 34 appearances during the 1975–76 season.

Career statistics

References

1957 births
Living people
Footballers from Isleworth
English footballers
Brentford F.C. players
English Football League players
Isthmian League players
Association football defenders
Hayes F.C. players